Mike Jacobs may refer to:

Mike Jacobs (first baseman) (born 1980), American baseball player; first North American in professional sports to be tested positive for HGH
Mike Jacobs (shortstop) (1877–1949), played for the Chicago Cubs
Mike Jacobs (boxing) (1880–1953), American boxing promoter and member of the International Boxing Hall of Fame
Mike Jacobs (Georgia politician), representing District 80 in the Georgia House of Representatives
Mike Jacobs (Illinois politician) (born 1960), Illinois State Senator
Michael Jacobs (producer) (born 1955), American film and TV producer
Mike Jacobs, guitarist and songwriter for bands including The Pasties and Evil Jake
Mike Jacobs, former news anchor for WTMJ-TV in Milwaukee from 1977 to 2015

See also
Michael Jacobs (disambiguation)
Michael Jacob (born 1980), Irish hurling player